Joseph Moosbrugger (10 March 1810, Konstanz - 13 October 1869, Konstanz) was a German landscape painter. His name is sometimes given as Josef Mosbrugger.

Biography 
He was the sixth and last child born to the painter, Wendelin Moosbrugger, and his second wife, Anna Maria, née Hüetlin (1774–1829). His brother, Friedrich, also became a painter, while his brother  was an architect. His half-brother, was a noted mathematician. The family was very active in local society circles, with many friends among the rich and influential. Summers at the family's estate gave him an early appreciation for nature.

Although he showed an interest in becoming an artist, he was a very poor student, so he worked as an apprentice with his father. His spare time was spent making sketches in the countryside. With the intent of becoming a portrait painter, he followed Friedrich to Munich where, in 1829, he enrolled in classes at the Academy of Fine Arts. He was only moderately successful, as his poor study habits quickly reasserted themselves, and he spent most of his time socializing. It soon became clear that he would not be successful in his desired field.

Under the influence of his friend, Eduard Schleich, he turned to landscape painting instead. Schleich also worked to promote his friend's paintings, and introduce him to the work of other artists, including Georg von Dillis, Heinrich Bürkel, and Wilhelm von Kobell. He also made numerous excursions throughout the region, seeking his own inspiration. Although he was able to earn a decent income, financial hardship was never far away. Plans to participate in the Exposition Universelle of 1855 did not work out. He was awarded a few commissions from the Grand Ducal court, but found no permanent patrons. In 1856, he returned to Konstanz.

In 1863, he took the collection's first inventory, and published a catalog in 1866.

Early in 1869, he fell ill with a lung disease, and was hospitalized until his death later that year.

References

Further reading 
 "Moosbrugger, Joseph". In: Hans Vollmer (Ed.): Allgemeines Lexikon der Bildenden Künstler von der Antike bis zur Gegenwart, Vol.25: Moehring–Olivié. E. A. Seemann, Leipzig 1931, pg.109
 Friedrich Pecht: "Die Familie der Konstanzer Mosbrugger", In: Konstanzer Zeitung. 23./ 24. 1869. Obituary. Transcript by Hans Giess, 1969, Stadtarchiv Konstanz.

External links 

1810 births
1869 deaths
19th-century German painters
19th-century German male artists
German landscape painters
Academy of Fine Arts, Munich alumni
People from Konstanz